The Hotel of the Dead (German: Das tote Hotel) is a 1921 German silent thriller film directed by Martin Hartwig and starring Albert Steinrück, Fritz Beckmann and Rosa Valetti. It premiered in Berlin on 13 August 1921.

Cast
Albert Steinrück as Senator Petersen
Fritz Beckman as Lindholm
Rosa Valetti
Lya Sellin as Inge
Gertrude W. Hoffman as Dama
Alfred Schmasow as Gefängniswärter
Hermann Picha as Schneider
Alexander Areuss as Olaf
Danny Guertler as Peer
Adele Hartwig as Senator Petersen
Bernecke Heinz as Jens
Paul Voissel as Carl

References

External links

Films of the Weimar Republic
German silent feature films
German thriller films
Films directed by Martin Hartwig
German black-and-white films
1920s thriller films
Silent thriller films
1920s German films